Aleksey Solodyankin (born 14 May 1972) is a Russian ski jumper. He competed in the normal hill and large hill events at the 1994 Winter Olympics.

References

1972 births
Living people
Russian male ski jumpers
Olympic ski jumpers of Russia
Ski jumpers at the 1994 Winter Olympics
Sportspeople from Kirov, Kirov Oblast